Ladies Tailor is a 1986 Indian Telugu-language comedy film, produced by K. Sarada Devi under the Sri Sravanthi Movies banner, presented by Sravanthi Ravi Kishore and written and directed by Vamsy. It stars Rajendra Prasad and Archana, with music composed by Ilaiyaraaja.

The film was dubbed into Tamil under the same name.  The movie was remade in Marathi as Kuthe Kuthe Shodhu Me Tila (1989), starring Laxmikant Berde and Varsha Usgaonkar and in Hindi in 2006 with the same name as original, starring Rajpal Yadav and Kim Sharma.

Plot
Sundaram is a talented but very lazy tailor who believes that good fortune and luck alone will make him a rich and successful person. He is the only tailor in the whole village. Even though Sitaramudu, the assistant of Sundaram and Battala Satyam, the cloth vendor, keep urging him to work, he never listens to them. One day a Koyadora tells Sundaram that he will become a rich person if he marries a woman with a mole on her right thigh. In the process of discovering this woman, he flirts with many in the village and promises all of them that he would marry them.

The rest of the story revolves around how he deals with each lady with his talent and deceit. In the end, everyone discovers the truth and Sundaram is made to realize that in his foolish quest to find the lady with the mole, he has cheated and hurt many people. He then tries to atone for his crimes by first apologizing to all the women he cheated and then by marrying the one who truly loved him. His assistant Sitaramudu ends up marrying the girl with the mole.

Cast
Rajendra Prasad as Sundaram
Archana as Sujatha
Rallapalli as Koyadora (soothsayer)
Tanikella Bharani as Police
Mallikarjuna Rao as Battala Satyam
Subhalekha Sudhakar as Sitaramudu
Pradeep Shakthi as Venkataratnam
Karun as Srinivas
Dham as Photographer Jembulingam
Deepa as Daiya
Sandhya as Neelaveni
Y. Vijaya as Nagamani
Prudhviraj

Production

Development 
Sravanthi Ravi Kishore along with his friends Thammudu Satyam and Vemuri Satyanarayana together formed a production company Sravanthi Film Arts. Ladies Tailor became company's first project.

Casting and filming 
Archana whom initially auditioned for Vamsy's previous film Sitara was chosen as one of the lead actresses alongside Sandhya from Guntur and Deepa. For Tanikella Bharani's role, Vamsy's initial choice was Nutan Prasad however due to date issues, Bharani did the role instead. The film was mostly shot in and around Rajolu, Thatipaka, and Manepalli of West Godavari district.

Soundtrack
The soundtrack was composed by Ilaiyaraaja and all lyrics were written by Sirivennela Seetharama Sastry. Songs were released through ECHO music label. The song "Ekkada Ekkada" was composed and recorded after it was picturised as opposed to the usual norm of shooting after the song got recorded.

References

External links

1986 films
1986 comedy films
Films scored by Ilaiyaraaja
Telugu films remade in other languages
Films directed by Vamsy
Fictional tailors
1980s Telugu-language films